Ali Serim (born 1978, İstanbul), is a Turkish socialite. He is known as a strategist, corporate advisor, entrepreneur, writer and heritage activist.

Started his career in EY (formerly Ernst & Young), a multinational professional services firm headquartered in London, United Kingdom which is one of the largest professional services firm in the world and is one of the "Big Four" accounting firms; he is known for his expertise in both private sector engagement and advocacy in new market entry, strategic growth, financial management and overall stimulation of economic growth in the Turkish market

Published in various newspaper articles and 2 books Hürrem Sultan'ın Torunları and Constantinople 1918 Konstantiniyye and respected throughout them Istanbul community, he is a diligent leader with a reputation providing substantive and intellectual leadership.

He is nominated to Europa Nostra Award for his efforts to protect YILDIZ Palace.

As an activist he is working to underline the importance of museums in education and their role for boosting a country's economy. He is named as the leading heritage activist to fight with illicit trafficking of Ottoman period tombstones in 2014. Ali Serim is a Fellow of the RSA Royal Society for the encouragement of Arts, Manufactures and Commerce,  a Trustee of the Yıldız Palace Foundation and a member of UNESCO’s Turkish National Committee, Illicit Trafficking of Cultural Property Commission.
Ali is a known supporter of musical projects with a focus to composers like Monteverdi, Frescobaldi, Corelli, Vivaldi, Domenico, Alessandro Scarlatti, Couperin, Lully, Charpentier and Rameau, Telemann, Handel and Bach. Ali Serim is an art fanatic collecting mainly photography by Ansel Adams, Yousuf Karsh, Henri Cartier-Bresson, Annie Leibovitz, Brassaï, Brian Duffy, Ara Guler, Sami Guner and many others... He led the Yıldız Palace Foundation for a project within the Civil Society Facility – EU-Turkey Intercultural Dialogue: Museums Grant Scheme in 2013.

1983 elections which ended the military regime in Turkey was not enough to ensure the return to democracy at high standards so civil society intensified its efforts to assemble to develop various projects for youngsters like Ali Serim who participated voluntary projects since he was 15 years old for more democratization, had chance to have mentors like Suleyman Demirel and many other pioneering names.

Ali Serim is a former board member of ARI Movement which is an independent, non-partisan social movement founded in 1994 to promote volunteerism, civic activism and analytical thinking among Turkish youth, to raise future leaders by encouraging Turkish youth's intellectual development and social participation, thereby establishing an understanding of participatory democracy in Turkey. Ali Serim is also leading an initiative to establish "Istanbul American University" which will promote importance of original ideas and collaborative work, will be a local platform to host respected international scholars with a focus to social sciences which will be realized by 2023.

References

External links 
 

1978 births
Living people
Writers from Istanbul
Turkish businesspeople